is a Japanese Nippon Professional Baseball with the Chiba Lotte Marines in Japan's Pacific League.

External links

Living people
1982 births
Baseball people from Tokyo
Japanese baseball players
Nippon Professional Baseball pitchers
Chiba Lotte Marines players